There are two species of bird named seaside cinclodes.

Chilean seaside cinclodes, Cinclodes nigrofumosus
Peruvian seaside cinclodes, Cinclodes taczanowskii

Birds by common name